The 2022 Charleston Open (branded as the 2022 Credit One Charleston Open for sponsorship reasons) was a women's professional tennis tournament played on outdoor clay courts at the Family Circle Tennis Center on Daniel Island in Charleston, South Carolina. It was the 49th edition of the event on the WTA Tour and was classified as a WTA 500 tournament on the 2022 WTA Tour. It was the only event of the clay court season played on green clay.

Champions

Singles 

  Belinda Bencic def.  Ons Jabeur, 6–1, 5–7, 6–4

Doubles 

  Andreja Klepač /  Magda Linette def.  Lucie Hradecká /  Sania Mirza, 6–2, 4–6, [10–7]

Points and prize money

Point distribution

Prize money

Singles main draw entrants

Seeds 

1 Rankings as of March 21, 2022.

Other entrants 
The following players received wildcards into the main draw:
  Linda Fruhvirtová 
  Caty McNally
  Emma Navarro 
  Aryna Sabalenka

The following player received entry using a protected ranking into the main draw: 
  Katarina Zavatska

The following players received entry from the qualifying draw:
  Robin Anderson
  Sophie Chang
  Francesca Di Lorenzo
  Ulrikke Eikeri
  Nadiia Kichenok
  Allie Kiick
  Gabriela Lee
  Sachia Vickery

The following players received entry as lucky losers:
  CoCo Vandeweghe
  Heather Watson

Withdrawals 
 Before the tournament
  Danielle Collins → replaced by  Alycia Parks
  Simona Halep → replaced by  Anastasia Gasanova
  Veronika Kudermetova → replaced by  CoCo Vandeweghe
  Ann Li → replaced by  Katarina Zavatska
  Tereza Martincová → replaced by  Wang Xiyu
  Garbiñe Muguruza → replaced by  Claire Liu
  Jeļena Ostapenko → replaced by  Hailey Baptiste
  Nuria Párrizas Díaz → replaced by  Wang Xinyu
  Andrea Petkovic → replaced by  Arianne Hartono
  Arantxa Rus → replaced by  Yuan Yue
  Mayar Sherif → replaced by  Mariam Bolkvadze
  Elina Svitolina → replaced by  Magdalena Fręch
  Iga Świątek → replaced by  Heather Watson
 Retirements 
  Madison Brengle (left knee injury)
  Petra Kvitová (left thigh injury)

Doubles main draw entrants

Seeds 

1 Rankings as of March 21, 2022.

Other entrants 
The following pair received a wildcard into the doubles main draw:
  Francesca Di Lorenzo /  Katie Volynets

Withdrawals 
 Before the tournament
  Lyudmyla Kichenok /  Jeļena Ostapenko → replaced by  Lyudmyla Kichenok /  Anastasia Rodionova
  Darija Jurak Schreiber /  Andreja Klepač → replaced by  Andreja Klepač /  Magda Linette
  Alexa Guarachi /  Nicole Melichar-Martinez → replaced by  Anna Danilina /  Aliaksandra Sasnovich
  Magda Linette /  Bernarda Pera → replaced by  Tereza Mihalíková /  Květa Peschke

References

External links 
 Tournament details at the WTA
 

2022 WTA Tour
2022 in American tennis
2022 in sports in South Carolina
2022 Credit One Charleston Open
April 2022 sports events in the United States